Juliana Vasconcelos Póvoas (born April 16, 1988), better known by her stage name Jullie, is a Brazilian singer-songwriter, actress and voice actress.

Career
Born in Vila Velha, Espírito Santo, Jullie moved to São Paulo to pursue an acting career. In 1998, she appeared in television shows such as Xuxa Park, Gente Inocente and Criança Esperança. Jullie also landed her first starring role in Mais Uma Vez Amor, released in February 2005, interpreting the character Lia. In 2005 she began her career as a voice actress. Jullie lent her voice to many Brazilian versions of television series and films, including Blair Waldorf in Gossip Girl, Katie in Total Drama Island and Roxy in Winx Club.

Her debut album Hey!, was released on September 22, 2009, the album was influenced by singers like Lily Allen, Madonna, Alanis Morissette, and its main reference, Katy Perry, directed to a feminist position. The album was praised by the young, calling Jullie the "Brazilian Katy Perry" for her music style and way of dressing. The first single, "Alice", was released in April, and the second single, "Hey!", was released in November 2009. In February 2010, "Tudo Pode Mudar", a cover of the popular band from the 1980s Metrô, was released for the Brazilian TV series Malhação. On August 2, 2010, Julie recorded a Brazilian version of "Wouldn't Change a Thing" entitled "Eu Não Mudaria Nada em Você" with Joe Jonas for Camp Rock 2: The Final Jam soundtrack. On January 5, 2013 the musical Tudo por um pop star ('for a pop star, everything'), based on the book by Thalita Rebouças, in which she was one of the protagonists, was released.

Discography

Albums

EPs

Singles

Other appearances

Soundtracks

Filmography

Film

Television

Voiceovers

References

External links
 
 Fan site
 Jullie on Myspace

1988 births
Living people
Brazilian women pop singers
Brazilian voice actresses
People from Vila Velha
Brazilian television actresses
Brazilian film actresses
21st-century Brazilian singers
21st-century Brazilian women singers